Mastering may refer to

 Mastering (audio), the process of transferring recorded audio from a source  containing the final mix to a data storage device, the master
 Stem mastering, contains the same process as ordinary mastering but the individual audio tracks are grouped together into a few separated stems like drums, instruments, voices, etc.
 Bus mastering, a feature supported by many data bus architectures that enables a device connected to the bus to initiate transactions

See also
 Master (disambiguation)